The Haas VF-16 is a Formula One car designed and built by Italian chassis manufacturer Dallara on behalf of Haas F1 Team for use in the 2016 Formula One season. The car was powered by Ferrari's 2016-specification power unit, the Ferrari 061. It was driven by former Lotus driver Romain Grosjean and Esteban Gutiérrez, who has made his return to competition after spending the 2015 season as a testing and development driver for Ferrari. The car made its competitive debut at the 2016 Australian Grand Prix.

This was the first Formula One car to use Pennzoil lubricant.

Development history

Naming
The origin of naming the car "VF-16" is derived from the first CNC machine manufactured by Haas Automation, the VF-1, launched in 1988. The "V" stands for vertical, which is an industry standard designation for a vertical mill. Gene Haas, founder of Haas Automation, added "F1" to the name to unofficially designate it as the company's "Very First One".

Design
Italian chassis manufacturer Dallara was contracted to design the VF-16 in December 2014, shortly after Haas' entry was accepted to the grid. Team founder Gene Haas chose to structure the team as a client of Scuderia Ferrari, and as a result, the VF-16 shares several elements—including the gearbox and suspension—with Ferrari's 2016 entry, the SF16-H.

Testing
The VF-16 was unveiled at the Circuit de Barcelona-Catalunya ahead of the first pre-season test. Its early testing phase was overshadowed by a front wing failure, fuel feed problems and complications surrounding a turbo failure.

In competition
The VF-16 made its competitive début at the Australian Grand Prix, where it made an inauspicious start to its season when Romain Grosjean collided with Rio Haryanto in pit lane during practice. Both Grosjean and Esteban Gutiérrez were eliminated early in qualifying, with both VF-16s occupying the penultimate row of the grid. During the race, Grosjean ran as high as tenth when Gutiérrez collided with Fernando Alonso, causing Alonso's McLaren to roll over and prompting the race to be temporarily stopped while the scene of the accident was cleaned up. The team took advantage of the race stoppage to switch Grosjean's strategy, putting him on the most durable tyre compound available and running him to the end of the race on one set of tyres.

At the next round in Bahrain, Grosjean qualified in ninth place and went on to beat his Melbourne result by finishing fifth. Gutiérrez qualified in thirteenth place, but once again retired from the race, this time with brake problems. 

Grosjean also scored points at the Russian, Austrian and United States Grands Prix, while Gutiérrez could only manage a best finish of eleventh at a handful of races. He was not retained by the team for 2017, being replaced by Kevin Magnussen.

Complete Formula One results
(key) (results in bold indicate pole position; results in italics indicate fastest lap)

Footnotes

References

VF-16